William Brereton (c. 1487 – 17 May 1536), the son of a Cheshire landowner, was a Groom of the Privy Chamber to Henry VIII. In May 1536, Brereton, the queen's brother George Boleyn, Viscount Rochford, Sir Henry Norris, Sir Francis Weston and a musician, Mark Smeaton, were tried and executed for treason and adultery with Anne Boleyn, the king's second wife. Many historians are now of the opinion that Anne Boleyn, Brereton and their co-accused were innocent.

Family
William Brereton, born between 1496 and 1499, was the seventh son of Sir Randle Brereton of Ipstones, Shocklach, and Malpas, Knight Chamberlain of Chester, knight banneret and knight of the body of Henry VII. His mother was Eleanor, sister of Piers Dutton of Halton, Cheshire.  Along with three of his brothers, including Sir Urian Brereton, William entered royal service. By 1521 he was a groom of the king's chamber, and from 1524, groom of the privy chamber.

Marriage and issue
In 1529, Brereton married Elizabeth, daughter of Charles Somerset, 1st Earl of Worcester, widow of Sir John Savage, and second cousin to Henry VIII. He and Elizabeth had two sons:
 Henry Brereton
 Thomas Brereton
Elizabeth's first husband was the grandson of Sir John Savage, who had been a Lancastrian commander at the battle of Bosworth in 1485. When the grandson had fallen into debt, and was also being held in the Tower for murder, all his lands were forfeited to the crown, and Brereton, as the king's man in Cheshire, was granted jurisdiction over them. After Sir John Savage's death, Brereton's marriage to his widow established a family relationship with the king and thus cemented his position as a royal servant.

In reward for his work for the king, Brereton received a number of royal grants in Cheshire and the Welsh Marches. These eventually brought him more than £10,000 a year. However, he wielded power ruthlessly, on one occasion, engineering the judicial murder of John ap Gryffith Eyton, whom he blamed for instigating the killing of one of his own retainers.

Arrest, trial and execution
In May 1536, Anne Boleyn was accused of adultery with Mark Smeaton, a musician of the royal household, and the courtiers Henry Norris, Sir Francis Weston, and William Brereton as well as her brother, George Boleyn, Viscount Rochford, all of the privy chamber.
The king's chief minister, Thomas Cromwell, "authorised and commissioned by the king," masterminded the proceedings against the queen and her co-accused. The allegation against Brereton, who had been arrested on 4 May, was that Anne solicited him on 16 November 1533, and misconduct took place on 27 November. Historian Eric Ives argues that Cromwell added Brereton to the plot against Anne to end the troubles he was causing in the Welsh Marches, and to reorganise (and centralise) the local government of this area.

The trials of William Brereton, Henry Norris, Sir Francis Weston, and Mark Smeaton took place at Westminster Hall on 12 May. They were charged with high treason against the king, adultery with the queen and plotting the king's death. Having been found guilty, they were all sentenced to be hanged, drawn and quartered. (The sentence was later reduced to beheading). The Queen and her brother were tried separately on 15 May within the Tower.

On 17 May, William Brereton, George Boleyn, Viscount Rochford, Henry Norris, Sir Francis Weston and Mark Smeaton, were led from the Tower to a scaffold on Tower Hill. George Constantyne, an eyewitness to their executions, recorded their last words. Brereton's words as he faced the executioner's axe, "The cause whereof I die, judge not. But if you judge, judge the best," may be interpreted as a cautious declaration of his innocence which would avoid the forfeiture of his estates. An indication of his wife's continued trust in her husband is provided by her bequest to her son nine years later: "one bracelet of gold, the which was the last token his father sent me."

Portrayals
William Brereton was portrayed by James Gilbert on the Showtime series, The Tudors, during season 2. The show presents him as a dedicated Catholic, prepared to act as assassin in the guise of courtier. He is commissioned by the Pope (Peter O'Toole) and ambassador Eustace Chapuys (Anthony Brophy) to assassinate Anne Boleyn (Natalie Dormer), to revert King Henry VIII (Jonathan Rhys Meyers) from steering the English state at collision course with the Catholic Church. He was accused of having had carnal knowledge of the queen. Unlike the others in his position, who either denied – George Boleyn (Pádraic Delaney) and Henry Norris (Stephen Hogan) – were tortured into admitting it – Mark Smeaton (David Alpay) – or acquitted – Thomas Wyatt (Jamie Thomas King) – Brereton falsely states his guilt to Thomas Cromwell (James Frain), knowing that it will ensure the Queen's conviction for high treason, and thus the fulfilment of his objective, albeit at the cost of his own life.

On The Tudors, although Brereton was an actual historical figure, his character was totally fictionalised. William Brereton is portrayed as a young man, while in reality he was almost fifty. Moreover, he was not a Jesuit, nor was he commissioned by the Pope to assassinate Anne Boleyn. Anne was crowned queen in 1533 and executed in 1536, while the Pope did not formally establish the Jesuit order until 1540. Brereton was probably collateral damage when Thomas Cromwell moved against the Boleyn faction and decided to get rid of him in the same coup.

In Wolf Hall, a TV mini-series adaptation of the historical novel by Hilary Mantel, he was played by Alastair Mackenzie.

References

Bibliography

 
 
 
 in JSTOR

External links 
 Ives, Eric W., William Brereton and the Pork Barrel: Travails of Political Ascendancy
 Sir William Brereton, Knight Family tree

1480s births
1536 deaths
William
People executed under the Tudors for treason against England
Executed people from Cheshire
Prisoners in the Tower of London
16th-century English people
People executed by Tudor England by decapitation
People executed under Henry VIII
Publicly executed people